Andrea Cano (born 18 April 1976) is an Italian football manager and former player who played as a goalkeeper. He is currently the director of coaching for youth goalkeepers at Padova Football Academy.

Playing career
Cano's career began with Narnese. He  moved to Lazio in Serie A before returning to Narnese. He later played for Frosinone and Lanciano. From 2005 he played for Calcio Padova, renewing his contract several times before leaving the club in 2012.

In October 2012 he moved to Bassano Virtus in the Lega Pro Seconda Divisione and in November 2013 joined Delta Porto Tolle in the same division. At the end of the 2013–14 season he retired as a player.

Coaching career
In the summer of 2015 Cano became the youth goalkeepers coach for Abano in Serie D. In July 2016 he moved to coach at Calcio Padova.

References

External links
 Profile at Legaserieb.it 
 Profile at Football.it 

1976 births
Living people
Footballers from Rome
Italian footballers
Calcio Padova players
Serie A players
Serie B players
Association football goalkeepers